The Roman Milestones of Braga are a series of ancient road markers located in civil parish of Braga (Maximinos, Sé e Cividade), municipality of Braga in northern Portugal.

History
The Via de Braga a Guimarães was constructed during the period of Romanization of the later-Portuguese territory. Specifically, during the first half of the 1st century, this roadway and associated river raised bridges connected Guimarães and Bracara Augusta (Braga) then one of the most important urban nuclei in the region (called Conventus Bracaraugustanus).

From 41 B.C. milestones were erected in Braga by masons in the function of various Roman emperors, including Claudius, Nerva, Hadrian, Caracalla, Elagabalus, Maximinus Thrax, Carus, Carinus, Diocletian, Maximian, Galerius, Constantius Chlorus, Magnentius, Constantine and Maximinus Daia.

6 (CIL4750), Claudius, milha IV, Braga, Sé, Carvalheiras
14 (CIL4751), Nerva, Braga, Sé, Carvalheiras
21 (CIL4752), Hadrian, milha XIII, Braga, Sé, Carvalheiras
29 (CIL4753), Caracalla, Braga, Sé, Carvalheiras
30 (CIL4754), Caracalla, Carvalheiras
40 (CIL4768 e 4769), Elagabalus, Braga, Sé, Carvalheiras
41 (CIL4766), Elagabalus, milha III, Braga, Sé, Carvalheiras
43 (CIL4757), Maximian and Maximinus Thrax, Braga, Sé, Carvalheiras
44 (CIL4756), Maximian and Maximinus Thrax, Braga, Sé, Carvalheiras
59 (CIL4860), Carus, Braga, Sé, Carvalheiras
63 (CIL4761), Carinus, milha VI, Braga, Sé, Carvalheiras
67 (inédito), Diocletian, Braga, Sé, Carvalheiras
68 (inédito), Maximian, Braga, Sé, Carvalheiras
70 (inédito), Galerius, Braga, Sé, Carvalheiras
72 (inédito), Constantius Chlorus, Braga, Sé, Carvalheiras
76 (CIL4765), Magnentius, Braga, Sé, Carvalheiras
83 (inédito), Constantine or Constantius Chlorus or Constantine II, Braga, Sé, Carvalheiras
84 (CIL6210), unknown, Marco de Canavezes, Freixo, alongside the church
86 (CIL4758), Maximian and Maximinus Thrax, Braga, Sé, Carvalheiras
100 (inédito), Braga, Sé, Carvalheiras
101 (inédito), Braga, Sé, Carvalheiras, in the estate of Conselheiro Pimentel.

The milestones were essential to the consolidation of the new territorial administration imposed by Rome and the routes served inherent military purposes, while assuring the transport of raw materials (specifically metals) essential to the good performance of the new imperial order. 

Many of these milestones were investigated and analyzed by Francisco Martins de G. M. Sarmento (1833–1899) and Albano Belino (1863–1906). A series of milestones that were classified in 1910 by Martins Capela (later known as the 'Série Capela), in his public examination of milestones of Conventus Bracaraugustanus dating from 1895. In this work, Capela inventoried a group of 21 milestones or fragments (of which there is no evidence from where they were discovered), including 20 encountered in the Campo das Carvalheiras in Braga and one near the Church of Freixo, in Marco de Canavezes.

There discovery and analysis resulted in an ample campaign by the Conselho Superior dos Monumentos Nacionaes (National Monuments Superior Council), then attached to the Ministerio das Obras Publicas, Commercio e Industria (Ministry of Public Works, Commercial and Industry), that was involved in cataloguing the artistic and archaeological patrimony. These efforts resulted in its inclusion on a list of national monuments, that were then classified in 1910.

Architecture

Examples of the Roman milestones are housed in the installations of the Museum D. Diogo de Sousa.

In the territory the milestones are various heights and diameters, in various locations (such as the Passeio das Carvalheiras and Rua dos Bombeiros Voluntários'', from various epochs.

References

Notes

Sources
 
 
 
 
 
 

Ancient Roman buildings and structures in Portugal
National monuments in Braga District
Buildings and structures in Braga
Tourist attractions in Braga